Afrarchaea godfreyi is the type species of the genus Afrarchaea.

References

Archaeidae
Spiders of Madagascar
Spiders of South Africa
Taxa named by Raymond Robert Forster
Endemic fauna of South Africa